William Lycurgus Eagle (July 25, 1877 – April 27, 1951) was an American professional baseball player who played four games during the  season. He was born in Rockville, Maryland, and died at the age of 73 in Churchton, Maryland.

External links

Major League Baseball outfielders
Washington Senators (1891–1899) players
1877 births
1951 deaths
Baseball players from Maryland
19th-century baseball players
Auburn Maroons players
Taunton Herrings players
Sportspeople from Rockville, Maryland